Nils Reielson Sandal (born 9 June 1950 in Breim) is a Norwegian politician for the Centre Party.

He served as a deputy representative to the Norwegian Parliament from Sogn og Fjordane during the term 1997–2001.

On the local level, he served as deputy mayor in Gloppen municipality in 1984–1986, and then mayor in 1987–1999. Following the 2007 elections, Sandal became the new county mayor (fylkesordfører) of Sogn og Fjordane.

References

NRK County Encyclopedia of Sogn og Fjordane 

1950 births
Living people
Centre Party (Norway) politicians
Mayors of places in Sogn og Fjordane
Chairmen of County Councils of Norway
Deputy members of the Storting
People from Gloppen